was a motorway in Germany, in the state of Hesse.

It was constructed from 1974 to 1979 and led south from the Hanau exit of the A 3. It went through Rodgau and ended at Dieburg, where the Autobahn connected to the A 680 leading westward to Darmstadt.

The Autobahn was downgraded to a Bundesstraße (Bundesstraße 45) in the 80s. Only the signs were changed though - the road, equipped with parking fields and hard shoulders, remained the same. In the 90s the road was continued northward, which turned the Hanau exit into a true interchange and removed the roundabout that used to be there. The continuation to the north, leading through the city of Hanau, is now called the Bundesstraße 43a.

External links

683
A683